Fit Lover is a 2008 Chinese romantic comedy directed by Zhang Jianya.

In the previous film, a divorced man must choose between a dozen women. In Fit Lover, the protagonist, played by Karena Lam, must choose between several leading men.

External links

Fit Lover at the Chinese Movie Database

2008 films
Chinese romantic comedy films
2000s Mandarin-language films
Films directed by Zhang Jianya
2008 romantic comedy films